Cloşca (also known as Micro 14) is a residential district of Satu Mare in Romania. It is named after the Romanian revolutionary Cloşca also known as Ion Oargă.

References

Districts of Satu Mare